Several ships have been named Rosella:

 was launched at Newcastle upon Tyne. She sailed widely until she was wrecked in 1860.
 was launched in Newcastle upon Tyne and was wrecked on 7 December 1825.
, of 283 tons (bm), was launched at Sunderland with J.Atkinson, master, W.Atkinson, owner, and trade Clyde–Calcutta.

See also

Citations

Ship names